Store Meinickeøya is the largest island in Meinickeøyane, part of Thousand Islands, an island group south of Edgeøya.

References

 Norwegian Polar Institute Place Names of Svalbard Database

Islands of Svalbard